Will Barfoot is an American politician. He is a Republican who represents the 25th district in the Alabama State Senate.

Biography

Barfoot holds a Bachelor of Arts in International Studies from Auburn University, and a Juris Doctor from Jones School of Law. He works as an attorney and was co-founder of Barfoot & Schoettker, a personal injury law firm in Montgomery, Alabama.

Political career

Barfoot served as a temporary probate judge in Montgomery County, Alabama in 2005.

In 2006, Barfoot challenged incumbent Larry Dixon in the Republican primary for nomination for the District 25 seat in the Alabama State Senate. He lost, with 32.60% of the vote to Dixon's 58.43%.

Barfoot was elected to serve as a delegate for Mike Huckabee at the 2008 Republican National Convention.

In 2018, Barfoot ran again for the District 25 seat, this time to replace Dick Brewbaker, who had decided not to seek re-election. He defeated Ronda Walker in the Republican primary with 64.0% of the vote, and defeated David Sadler in the general election with 61.3% of the vote.

Barfoot sits on the following Senate committees:
 Judiciary (Vice Chairperson)
 Confirmations
 Banking and Insurance
 Fiscal Responsibility and Economic Development
 Children Youth and Human Services
 Veterans and Military Affairs

Electoral record

2006

2018

References

Republican Party Alabama state senators
Year of birth missing (living people)
Living people
Auburn University alumni
Thomas Goode Jones School of Law alumni
21st-century American politicians